This is a list of flags used in Pakistan.

National Flag

Government Flags

Civil Ensign

Civil Air Ensign

Provincial and territorial flags

Military

Naval rank flags

Historical flags

Pre-colonial states

British India

Former national flag proposals

See also 

 National Flag of Pakistan

References

External links 

Pakistan
 
Pakistani culture
Flags